, also known as Lady Oscar and La Rose de Versailles, is a Japanese manga series written and illustrated by Riyoko Ikeda. It was originally serialized in the manga magazine Margaret from 1972 to 1973, while a revival of the series was published in the magazine from 2013 to 2018. The series is a historical drama set in the years preceding and during the French Revolution. Using a combination of historical personages and original characters, The Rose of Versailles focuses primarily on the lives of two women: the Queen of France Marie Antoinette, and Oscar François de Jarjayes, who serves as commander of the Royal Guard.

Ikeda created The Rose of Versailles as a story about revolution and populist uprisings after becoming involved with Japan's New Left as a member of the Communist Party of Japan in the late 1960s. The series was developed during a significant transitional period for shōjo manga (manga for girls) as a medium, characterized by the emergence of stories with complex narratives focused on politics and sexuality. The Rose of Versailles would ultimately become the first shōjo manga to achieve mainstream critical and commercial success, proving the genre's viability as a commercial category and granting the genre greater recognition among critics. It contributed significantly to the development of shōjo manga, and was one of the primary works responsible for its shift from a genre aimed at children to a genre aimed at adolescents and young adults. By 2013, the manga has sold over 20 million copies worldwide.

The Rose of Versailles has been adapted multiple times, notably as a television anime series that aired on Nippon TV, a live-action film directed by Jacques Demy, and a series of musicals staged by the Takarazuka Revue. Several sequels and spin-offs have also been produced, notably Eikou no Napoleon – Eroica. An English-language translation of the manga has been published by Udon Entertainment, while the anime adaptation is currently licensed in North America by Discotek Media.

Synopsis

The Rose of Versailles is set in France before and during the French Revolution. The primary character of the story is Marie Antoinette, the teenaged Dauphine and later Queen of France, but the series later re-focuses to a woman named Oscar François de Jarjayes. As the youngest of six daughters, Oscar was raised like a son from birth by her military general father to succeed him as commander of the Royal Guard at the Palace of Versailles. Oscar's friend (and later lover) André Grandier, a commoner who is the grandson of her nanny, serves as her attendant.

The primary action of the story revolves around Oscar's growing realization of how France is governed, and of the plight of the country's poor. When Antoinette begins an affair with the Swedish count Axel von Fersen, their relationship becomes the subject of gossip and scandal throughout France, and Antoinette's reputation is damaged. After von Fersen leaves Europe to fight in the American Revolutionary War, a distraught Antoinette begins spending lavishly on jewellery and clothing to distract herself from his absence. Her spending mires France in debt, while the Affair of the Diamond Necklace and the machinations of the scheming Duchess of Polignac further aggravate public sentiment toward the monarchy.

As the revolution intensifies, Oscar is unable to ignore the suffering of the French public, and leaves the Royal Guard to join the French Guards. André dies fighting alongside Oscar with the revolutionaries and the French Guards during a skirmish with the military; Oscar herself dies the following day, leading the revolutionaries during the Storming of the Bastille. Sometime thereafter, Antoinette and the royal family are taken as prisoners by the revolutionaries. After being tried by the Revolutionary Tribunal, Antoinette is sentenced to death by guillotine.

Characters

The Rose of Versailles juxtaposes a combination of real-life historical personages and original characters created by Ikeda. The action of the story is primarily focused on Marie Antoinette and Oscar François de Jarjayes, who alternately serve as the primary character of the series, while Axel von Fersen serves as the object of affection for both women. Two additional characters, André Grandier and Rosalie Lamorliere, function within the story as audience surrogates.

Development

Context

The Rose of Versailles creator Riyoko Ikeda came of age in the 1960s, a decade that saw the rise of the New Left in Japan. This political movement, inspired in part by the ideals of the French Revolution, galvanized Japanese youth and led to the formation of student protest movements. Upon entering university in 1966, Ikeda became a part of this movement after joining the Democratic Youth League of Japan, the youth branch of the Japanese Communist Party. Ikeda made her debut as a manga artist in 1967, with her early works generally falling into one of two categories: romantic stories typical of shōjo manga of the era, and socially and politically motivated stories that addressed themes such as poverty, diseases caused by nuclear weapons, and discrimination against Japan's burakumin population.

Shōjo manga (girls' manga) of the 1960s largely consisted of simple stories marketed towards elementary school-aged girls, with discussions of topics such as politics and sexuality considered taboo. These attitudes began to shift in the 1970s, as new authors began to move shōjo manga away from an audience of children towards an audience of adolescents and young women. This shift came to be embodied by a new generation of shōjo manga artists collectively referred to as the Year 24 Group, of which Ikeda has been associated; the group was so named because its members were born in or around year 24 of the Shōwa era (or 1949 in the Gregorian calendar). The group contributed significantly to the development of shōjo manga by expanding the genre to incorporate elements of science fiction, historical fiction, adventure fiction, and same-sex romance: both male-male (yaoi) and female-female (yuri).

Production and release

As the New Left declined in the early 1970s, Ikeda decided to create a manga focused on themes of revolution and populist uprising. After researching the French Revolution for two years, Ikeda proposed a manga series that would be a biography of Marie Antoinette to her editors at the Japanese publishing company Shueisha. Though Ikeda's editors were reticent about the concept, the first chapter of The Rose of Versailles was published on May 21, 1972, in the weekly magazine Margaret. As a result of this lack of support from her editors, Ikeda frequently relied on feedback from fans to determine the direction of the story; for example, Rosalie was initially conceived by Ikeda as an audience surrogate character, but she proved to be unpopular among readers and is replaced in this role by the more-popular André as the series progresses.

Ikeda modeled her depiction of Antoinette on typical shōjo heroines of the era: lively, sentimental, and seeking love, with her rivalry with Madame du Barry mirroring shōjo stories that focus on rivalries between schoolgirls. The exotic Western setting marked by a rococo style was also similarly aligned with typical shōjo manga settings of the 1970s. Oscar is initially introduced as a supporting character, with Ikeda's decision to make the commander of the Royal Guard a woman rooted in her belief that she could not convincingly write a character who was a male soldier. The character became immediately popular, with Oscar's characterization as a strong and charismatic woman resonating with the shōjo audience; in response to positive feedback from readers, Oscar eclipses Antoinette to become the main character of The Rose of Versailles as the series progresses.

As the series shifted to focus on Oscar, Ikeda pursued a more serious tone relative to early chapters of The Rose of Versailles in terms of her depiction of politics, social issues, and sexuality; the art style also shifts, both to reflect this tonal change and to depict how the characters have aged. Following Oscar and André's deaths, readership of The Rose of Versailles declined precipitously; the November 4, 1973 issue of Margaret, published two weeks after Oscar's death, contains a note from the editors indicating that they had been inundated with letters from readers asking for Oscar and André be brought back to life. Though Ikeda wished to continue the series and depict the entirety of the French Revolution, her editors convinced her to conclude the series shortly thereafter. The final chapters of the series shift back to Antoinette as the primary character, and depict the events of the revolution from the fall of the Bastille to Antoinette's death.

Revival
In 2013, Shueisha invited Ikeda to write a column in Margaret to mark the 50th anniversary of the magazine. Ikeda asked if she could instead write additional chapters of The Rose of Versailles that she was unable to publish due to the series' shortened serialization; her request was accepted, and additional chapters of The Rose of Versailles began serialization in Margaret on April 20, 2013. The first chapter, which focuses on André's childhood, adapts a story that Ikeda had written for a musical adaptation of The Rose of Versailles staged by the Takarazuka Revue. The final chapter of the revival was published on February 5, 2018, and connects the story of The Rose of Versailles to the manga series The Poe Clan by Moto Hagio; Ikeda is a friend of Hagio's and a fan of The Poe Clan, and received Hagio's permission to connect the two stories.

English-language release
Writer and translator Frederik L. Schodt translated The Rose of Versailles into English for use as reference by the producers of the manga's 1979 live-action film adaptation Lady Oscar; only one copy of the translation was produced, which was lost. In 1981, Schodt again translated the first two volumes of The Rose of Versailles into English for the Japanese publishing house Sanyusha, which were published as instructional materials for Japanese readers seeking to learn English. An excerpt from Schodt's translation was included in his 1983 book Manga! Manga! The World of Japanese Comics.

In July 2015, Udon Entertainment announced that it had acquired English-language publishing rights for The Rose of Versailles. Originally scheduled for release in 2016, the first volume in the five-volume hardcover series was released in January 2020, while the final volume was released in April 2021.

Themes and analysis

Sexuality
Shōjo manga of the 1960s and earlier generally depicted one of two kinds of love stories: heterosexual romances between a passive girl and a Prince Charming-like male, and Class S stories that depicted intense but fleeting homoerotic romantic friendships between girls. Rosalie, Oscar's first romantic interest, is reminiscent of Class S dynamics: the young and naïve Rosalie pines for the older and mature Oscar, though Oscar rebuffs her advances on the grounds that they are both women. Her subsequent romantic interests are two Prince Charming figures: von Fersen, who rejects Oscar because he perceives her only as a man, and The Count of Girodelle, Oscar's arranged fiancé whom she rejects because he treats her only as a woman.

Oscar ultimately enters a relationship with André, who Ikeda did not initially conceive as a potential romantic partner for Oscar; his status as Oscar's true and final love was incorporated into the story on the basis of reader feedback. Manga scholar Deborah Shamoon notes that while Oscar and André's relationship is "in a biological sense heterosexual, it is still configured within the story as homogender": Oscar is a masculine woman, while André is an emasculated man. Shamoon notes that André is of lower social status relative to Oscar, that it is André and not Oscar who experiences "the stereotypically female pain of unrequited love," and that the close physical resemblance between Oscar and André echoes the aesthetics of the then-emerging boys' love (male-male romance) genre.

Historicity

Ikeda derived the historical elements of The Rose of Versailles from the 1932 biography Marie Antoinette: The Portrait of an Average Woman by Stefan Zweig. The depiction of Marie Antoinette in The Rose of Versailles is largely rendered as it is narrated in the biography: her close relationship with her mother Maria Theresa, her loveless marriage with Louis XVI, her rivalry with Madame du Barry, her friendship with the Duchess of Polignac, the Affair of the Diamond Necklace, and her love for Axel von Fersen. Both Zweig and Ikeda portray Antoinette as a relatively unremarkable person who had an "accidental encounter with fate," contrasting both the villainous portrayals of Antoinette by the sans-culottes and the saintly depictions of Antoinette by pre-revolutionary Bourbons.

The largest deviations from historical events come in the form of Ikeda's original characters: Oscar, André, and the Jarjayes family are original creations of the author, though Oscar's father is loosely based on the real-life historical figure . The familial connection between Rosalie, Jeanne de Valois-Saint-Rémy, and the Duchess of Polignac is similarly an invention of the author, as are several supporting characters, such as Alain de Soissons. The chronology of certain historical events are also slightly altered for dramatic purposes (for example, von Fersen is not present during the Affair of the Diamond Necklace in the manga), and the manga contains some visual inaccuracies (for example, Oscar's French Guard uniform is actually the uniform worn by the Royal Guard during the Napoleonic era in the early 19th century).

Ikeda's depiction of the events of the French Revolution are informed by both her feminist and communist political leanings, and are personified in the story by Oscar. The narrative of The Rose of Versailles dramatizes the social realist doctrine advocated by the Japanese communist movement, addressing issues such as class consciousness, inequality between economic classes, the subordinate status of women, the duties of citizens, the material conditions of labor, and the manner in which rights for citizens arise from a mass and spontaneous revolt.

Feminism and gender
The feminist movement of post-war Japan was divided between consumerism, which advocated for the individualist pursuit of personal pleasure, and socialism (as embodied by the New Left), which rejected consumerism and sought a collectivist response to the subordinate status of women. Following the Asama-Sansō incident of February 1972, in which fourteen members of the United Red Army were killed in a purge, an increasing proportion of Japanese feminists rejected socialism in favor of consumerism. According to Nobuko Anan, a scholar of Japanese visual arts and gender, The Rose of Versailles embodies the tension between consumerism and socialism as a work of mass consumerist culture that nonetheless depicts what Ikeda describes as "the inner revolution of the Japanese women."

Ikeda has stated that she saw Marie Antoinette as a compelling figure in the way that she symbolized insubordination against the patriarchy, specifically her reluctance to accept the social impositions of Versailles, her loveless marriage, and the hatred that she aroused from both the court and public. However, Antoinette is limited in her ability to resist patriarchal forces by the imposition of motherhood; indeed, the abolition of the social obligation to become a mother was one of the main demands of the Japanese feminist movement at the time.

Deborah Shamoon argues that Oscar's popularity relative to Antoinette can be owed to her more complex characterization: first, that she is torn between her affection for Antoinette and the realization that she perpetuates a corrupt system; and second, that she "questions the assumptions of heterosexual romance and gender roles" through her androgyny and her search for an equal romantic partner who respects both her femininity and her masculinity. In this regard, the sex scene between Oscar and André is particularly notable: their relationship is egalitarian, both possess an androgynous appearance, and Oscar's breasts are not visible. Academic Yukari Fujimoto argues that the scene's depiction of a highly aestheticized version of sex "determined the image of sex in the minds of middle and high school female students around the time [...] not as a daily activity but as the ultimate way to convey once-in-lifetime love."

Adaptations

Anime

A television anime adaptation of The Rose of Versailles, produced by TMS Entertainment, aired on Nippon TV from October 10, 1979, to September 3, 1980. Episodes 1 to 12 of the series were directed by Tadao Nagahama, while episodes 19 to 40 were directed by Osamu Dezaki. Other members of the production team included Shingo Araki as animation director and character designer, Michi Himeno as character designer, and Kōji Makaino as music composer.

In North America, distribution rights for the anime adaptation of The Rose of Versailles were acquired by Right Stuf in 2012; the company released the series under its Nozomi Entertainment brand on DVD and on the streaming platform Viki in 2013. Rights for the series were later acquired by Discotek Media, which released the series on Blu-ray in 2021.

A single episode summarizing the events of the series, was also produced. The series was later adapted into the anime film , which was released on VHS on May 21, 1987. A remake of I'll Love You As Long As I Live was announced by Toei Animation in 2007, but as of 2021, remains unproduced. On September 6, 2022, a new anime film adaptation of The Rose of Versailles was announced to mark the fiftieth anniversary of the release of the manga series.

Musicals

The all-female theater revue the Takarazuka Revue has dramatized The Rose of Versailles multiple times since 1974. The show's role in Takarazuka history is particularly notable, as it triggered a significant surge in the revue's popularity and established its "Top Star" system of assigning lead roles. From 1974 to 1976, all four Takarazuka troupes staged The Rose of Versailles, drawing a total audience of 1.6 million; the revue's 1986 staging alone drew an audience of 2.1 million.

Live-action film

Lady Oscar, a live-action film adaptation of The Rose of Versailles, was released in Japan on March 3, 1979. The film was directed by Jacques Demy, and stars Catriona MacColl as Oscar and Barry Stokes as André.

Other
In 2014, an official Flash animation parody of The Rose of Versailles produced by the artist FROGMAN was released. In 2017, video game developer Otomate announced Berubara Private Academy: Rose of Versailles Re*imagination, a visual novel inspired by The Rose of Versailles, which was released in 2019.

Reception and legacy

Critical reception
Manga critic Jason Thompson has praised The Rose of Versailles as "a classic" of the medium, describing Ikeda's creation of Oscar as a "stroke of genius" and foundational to manga archetype of "a woman who plays the role of a man, sometimes struggling with the burden, but mostly surpassing men at their own game." Thompson notes that while this archetype was established in Osamu Tezuka's manga series Princess Knight, he favorably compares the "elegant and tragic" Oscar to Tezuka's "childlike and cute" series. Reviewing the first two English-language volumes of The Rose of Versailles for Otaku USA, Danica Davidson similarly praises The Rose of Versailles as a series that "helped revolutionize shōjo manga," drawing specific attention its "elegant, detailed and Rococo-infused" artwork.

Reviewing the anime adaptation of The Rose of Versailles for IndieWire, Charles Solomon noted that while the series "makes American daytime soap operas feel restrained," he cites it as "an intriguing example of cross-cultural cross-pollination." He notes that while that the "Versailles of the story is no more French than the town of Titipu in Gilbert and Sullivan's The Mikado is Japanese," he praises he manner in which an "occidental setting [is] treated as an exotic backdrop for a Japanese romantic fantasy, paralleling the way Western works of fiction have treated Japan." Jennifer Berman of THEM Anime gave the adaptation five out of five stars, praising its historical fiction elements but noting that its 1970s-style animation defined by "pointy chins" and "big sparkly eyes" may be unappealing to contemporary viewers.

Impact

The Rose of Versailles was the first major commercial success in the shōjo genre, and proved the genre's viability as a commercial category. By 2013, collected volumes of The Rose of Versailles have sold over 20 million copies worldwide; manga artist Moto Hagio notes that the commercial success of The Rose of Versailles influenced Japanese manga publishers to routinely publish serialized manga in the tankōbon format. The impact of The Rose of Versailles in promoting French history and culture was such that Ikeda was awarded the Legion of Honour by the French government in 2009.

The Rose of Versailles contributed significantly to the development of shōjo manga as a medium. Susan J. Napier notes that Oscar's characterization as a "complex and three-dimensional" female character who contrasted the "traditional demure and subdued idea of Japanese womanhood" heavily influenced how female characters were portrayed in shōjo media subsequent to The Rose of Versailles''' release. Oscar inspired multiple other "feisty cross-dressing heroines" in manga and anime, in series such as Hayate × Blade and Revolutionary Girl Utena. The series was additionally one of the primary works responsible for shōjo manga's shift from a genre aimed at children to a genre aimed at adolescents. This shift is reflected directly in the plot of the story itself, which progresses from a frivolous and light-hearted tone to a serious tone focused on political and social issues. Notably, the often brutal and violent deaths of the series' characters are permanent; this was a new paradigm in shōjo manga at the time, where it was common to bring deceased characters back to life using plot contrivances.

The series' success and notability has been sustained in the decades subsequent to the release of the manga through its various adaptations, notably the Takarazuka Revue musical adaptations. The musicals have been credited with popularizing Ikeda and The Rose of Versailles in Japan among the general public; by 2014, Takarazuka musical adaptations of The Rose of Versailles have been performed roughly 2,100 times to an estimated audience of over 5 million.

Sequels and spin-offs
Following the conclusion of The Rose of Versailles, Ikeda produced the following works:

 The spin-off manga series . It focuses on characters from the original series in stories unrelated to the events of the French Revolution, and introduces Oscar's niece Loulou de la Laurencie. It was serialized in Margaret from 1984 to 1985.
 The sequel manga series Eikou no Napoleon – Eroica. The series focuses on the First French Empire under the reign of Napoleon Bonaparte and features several characters from The Rose of Versailles in supporting roles, notably Rosalie, Bernard and Alain de Soissons. It was serialized in Margaret from 1986 to 1995.
 The parody manga series . It was serialized as a series of four-panel yonkoma comics in the newspaper The Asahi Shimbun'' from 2005 to 2013.

References

Bibliography

External links
 
 

 
1972 manga
1979 anime television series debuts
Anime series based on manga
Comics set in France
Comics set in the 18th century
Cross-dressing in anime and manga
Cross-dressing in television
Cultural depictions of Marie Antoinette
Discotek Media
French Revolution in fiction
Historical anime and manga
Manga adapted into films
Nippon TV original programming
Romance anime and manga
Shōjo manga
Shueisha franchises
Shueisha manga
Television series set in the French Revolution
TMS Entertainment
Works about the Affair of the Diamond Necklace